The men's 67 kg competition at the 2021 World Weightlifting Championships was held on 9 and 10 December 2021.

Schedule

Medalists

Records

Results

References

Results

Men's 67 kg